{{DISPLAYTITLE:C8H9N}}
The molecular formula C8H9N (molar mass: 119.167 g/mol) may refer to:

 4,7-Dihydroisoindole
 Indoline
 Isoindoline
 Azonine
 2,3-Cyclopentapyridine
 3,4-Cyclopentapyridine

Molecular formulas